Maikel Franciscus Wilhelmus Verkoelen (born 18 March 1992) is a Dutch footballer who plays as a centre back for RKSV Mierlo-Hout in the Dutch Tweede Klasse.

Club career
Verkoelen joined PSV at the age of eight, and eleven years later Verkoelen signed a professional contract at the age of 19. He played against SV Ried in the Europa League qualifying round on 18 August 2011, only make a one-minute appearance after coming on the 90th minute for Marcelo. In September 2011, Verkoelen made his cup debut against VVSB which PSV won 8–0 and Verkoelen set up the sixth goal that was scored by Jürgen Locadia.

In July 2012, Verkoelen joined FC Eindhoven on a season-long loan. He made his debut for the club against MVV, playing the full 90 minutes. Verkoelen scored his first goal for the club on his fifth appearance for FC Eindhoven, in the 3–4 home loss against Helmond Sport.

After having trained with Jong PSV for the first half of the season, Verkoelen signed a deal with German side Sportfreunde Siegen in January 2014. He only stayed until the end of the season.

On 4 August 2014, Verkoelen signed a two-year deal with Dutch Eerste Divisie side RKC Waalwijk after a successful trial. In May 2016, it was announced that Verkoelen had signed with Helmond Sport. He moved to TOP Oss in August 2018, but returned to Helmond Sport six months later.

Ahead of the 2019–20 season, Verkoelen signed with TEC in the third-tier Tweede Divisie. He was, however, released in September 2019, after reacting erroneous when substituted at halftime in a match against Kozakken Boys. He then moved to UNA in the same month. After the season, Verkoelen joined Mierlo-Hout in the seventh-tier Tweede Klasse.

International career
Verkoelen has been capped at Netherlands U17 and Netherlands U19 level.

References

External links

1992 births
Living people
Dutch footballers
PSV Eindhoven players
FC Eindhoven players
Sportfreunde Siegen players
RKC Waalwijk players
Helmond Sport players
TOP Oss players
SV TEC players
VV UNA players
Eerste Divisie players
Tweede Divisie players
Regionalliga players
Sportspeople from Helmond
Footballers from North Brabant
Association football central defenders